Constantine P. Iordanou is the chairman of the board and retired president and CEO of Arch Capital Group, an insurance, reinsurance, and mortgage insurance firm.

History 
Iordanou was the oldest of six kids on the island of Cyprus. His father was a police officer. Iordanou immigrated to the United States in 1969. He graduated New York University with a BS in Aerospace Engineering.

After college, Iordanou worked for AIG. He was hired by Berkshire Hathaway in 1987 and worked as president of the company's commercial casualty insurance division. He worked at Zurich North America from 1992 to 2001, including as COO and CEO of Zurich American and CEO of Zurich North America.
Iordanou was listed at #46 on The National Herald's list of Wealthiest Greek-Americans. He was named 2017 Insurance Leader of the Year by St. John's University's School of Risk Management.

Arch Capital Group 
Iordanou started Arch Capital Group with Paul Ingrey and Robert Clements in 2002, overseeing the firm's holding company. He was named CEO in 2002 and chairman of the board in 2009.

Iordanou is the director at Verisk Analytics, Inc., the Association of Bermuda Insurers and Reinsurers (ABIR), and the American Insurance Association (AIA). In 1975, he helped found the Pancyprian Association of America. Iordanou is a founding member of Faith: An Endowment for Orthodoxy and Hellenism.

References 

Bermudian businesspeople
Cypriot businesspeople
Cypriot emigrants to the United States
Expatriates in Bermuda
Year of birth missing (living people)
Living people